Rodolfo Emilio Giuseppe Pichi-Sermolli (24 February 1912 – 22 April 2005) was an Italian botanist.

He was born in Florence, son of Giuseppe Pichi-Sermolli and Maria née Del Rosso. He graduated in natural history from the University of Florence in 1935. He married Carla Bernardini on 9 April 1942, and they went on to have two children.

He was assistant at the Institute of Botany in the University of Florence from 1935 to 1958, then became professor of botany at the University of Sassari in Sardinia from 1958 to 1959. From 1959 he was professor at the Institute of Botany in the University of Genoa and director of the Botanical Garden.
He was a specialist on the ecology and phytogeography of tropical Africa, and also worked in plant taxonomy and pteridology.
He was a specialist on the ecology and phytogeography of tropical Africa, and also worked in plant taxonomy and pteridology.

Selected bibliography
Pichi-Sermolli, Rudolfo E. G. Authors of Scientific Names in Pteridophyta. Royal Botanic Gardens, Kew. 1996. 78pp, PB. .
Pichi-Sermolli, Rudolfo E. G. Index Filicum, Supplementum Quartum, pro Annis 1934–1960 [Index to the Ferns, Fourth Supplement, for Years 1934–1960]. International Bureau for Plant Taxonomy and Nomenclature, Utrecht, Netherlands. 1965. vi/370 pp., PB.
Pichi-Sermolli, Rudolfo E. G. "A provisional catalogue of the family names of living pteridophytes." Webbia 25: 219 - 297. 1970.
Pichi-Sermolli, Rudolfo E. G. "Historical review of the higher classification of the Filicopsida." In Jermy, A.C., Crabb, J.A. & Thomas, B.A. eds, Phylogeny and Classification of the Ferns. Suppl. 1 Bot. J. Linn. Soc. 67: 11 - 40, f. 1 - 8, pl. 1 - 19. 1973.
Pichi-Sermolli, Rudolfo E. G. "Tentamen pteridophytorum genera in taxanomicum ordinam redigendi." Webbia 31: 315 - 512. 1977.

General references

20th-century Italian botanists
Pteridologists
Scientists from Florence
University of Florence alumni
Academic staff of the University of Florence
Academic staff of the University of Sassari
Academic staff of the University of Genoa
1912 births
2005 deaths